A constitutional referendum was held in Cameroon on 21 February 1960. The new constitution would make the country a federal presidential republic with a unicameral federal parliament. It was passed by 60% of voters with a 75.5% turnout.

Results

References

1960 referendums
1960 in Cameroon
1960
Constitutional referendums